Rabiu is a Hausa given name or surname. Notable people with the name include:
Rabiu Afolabi, Nigerian footballer
Rabiu Baita, Nigerian footballer
Ibrahim Rabiu, Nigerian footballer
Rabiu Kwankwaso, Nigerian politician
Mohammed Rabiu, Ghanaian footballer
Isyaku Rabiu, Nigerian businessman
Abdul Samad Rabiu, Nigerian businessman
Kabiru Rabiu, Nigerian entrepreneur

Hausa given names
Hausa-language surnames